Mary Carolyn Morgan is a judge of the San Francisco County Superior Court and former judge of the San Francisco Municipal Court.  She was the first openly lesbian judge appointed in the United States.

Early life and education
Morgan received a B.A. from Smith College in 1967 and a J.D. from New York University School of Law in 1972.

Career

From 1981 to 1993, Morgan served on the San Francisco Municipal Court.  On April 3, 2003, Governor Gray Davis appointed Morgan to the San Francisco County Superior Court.

Personal

At the time of her appointment to the San Francisco County Superior Court, Morgan's partner was Roberta Achtenberg, who served as Assistant Secretary of the Department of Housing and Urban Development during the Clinton Administration.  Senator Jesse Helms, who had referred to Achtenberg as "that damn lesbian", had held up Achtenberg's nomination and was particularly outraged at discovering that Achtenberg and Morgan had kissed during a gay pride parade.

See also  
 List of first women lawyers and judges in California
 List of first women lawyers and judges in the United States
 List of LGBT jurists in the United States

References 

Living people
Smith College alumni
New York University School of Law alumni
LGBT appointed officials in the United States
LGBT judges
American women judges
California state court judges
People from the San Francisco Bay Area
Law in the San Francisco Bay Area
Year of birth missing (living people)